Lois E. Brown (born 22 January 1955, in Stouffville, Ontario) is a Canadian businesswoman and politician. She served as the Conservative Member of Parliament (MP) for Newmarket—Aurora from 2008 to 2015.

Political career

Brown is a former member of the Canadian Alliance and was nominated as its candidate for Newmarket—Aurora in advance of the 2004 federal election. When the party merged with the Progressive Conservative Party of Canada, however, Brown lost the Conservative nomination to Belinda Stronach, who went on to defeat Liberal candidate Martha Hall Findlay. Stronach later crossed the floor to the Liberal Party.

Brown was the Conservative nominee in the 2006 federal election, where Stronach defeated her by 4,805 votes.

Member of Parliament (2008–2015)

In the 2008 election, Brown was the riding's Conservative candidate once again, and this time she won the seat by defeating the new Liberal candidate, Tim Jones, by 6,623 votes. Stronach did not seek re-election and retired from politics.

In January 2011, Brown was appointed to the Red Tape Reduction Commission by Prime Minister Stephen Harper. Harper also appointed her Parliamentary Secretary to the Minister of International Cooperation.

In the 2011 election, Brown resumed her role as Conservative party candidate for the riding. She won a landslide victory over the other five candidates with 54.33% of votes in her riding, defeating the liberal candidate Kyle Peterson by 17,724 votes.

Following her re-election on 2 May 2011, Brown was re-appointed Parliamentary Secretary to the Minister of International Cooperation by Stephen Harper.

Brown sat on the Standing Committee on Foreign Affairs and International Development and she was a member of several Parliamentary Associations, Bilateral Associations, and Interparliamentary Groups.

In the 2015 election, Brown was defeated by Kyle Peterson by a margin of 1,459 votes.

2019 federal election

In October 2017, Brown announced that she would be seeking the Conservative nomination for Newmarket—Aurora in an attempt to regain her seat in the 43rd Canadian federal election. She was acclaimed as the candidate in March 2018. She subsequently finished second to the Liberal candidate, Tony Van Bynen.

Community involvement

Brown is an executive member of the Royal Canadian Legion and North Newmarket Lions Club and honorary chair of the Newmarket-Aurora Operation Red Nose volunteer designated driver program since 2009.

Electoral record

References

External links
 Lois Brown
 

1955 births
Women members of the House of Commons of Canada
Conservative Party of Canada MPs
Living people
Members of the House of Commons of Canada from Ontario
People from Newmarket, Ontario
People from Whitchurch-Stouffville
Women in Ontario politics
21st-century Canadian politicians
21st-century Canadian women politicians